NeXML is an exchange standard for representing phyloinformatic data. It was inspired by the widely used Nexus file format but uses XML to produce a more robust format for rich phylogenetic data. Advantages include syntax validation, semantic annotation, and web services.
The format is broadly supported and has libraries in many popular programming languages for bioinformatics.

External links
NeXML Github
NeXML manual

References

Biological sequence format
Computational phylogenetics